The 1941 Missouri Tigers football team was an American football team that represented the University of Missouri in the Big Six Conference (Big 6) during the 1941 college football season. The team compiled an 8–2 record (5–0 against Big 6 opponents), won the Big 6 championship, lost to Fordham in the 1942 Sugar Bowl, outscored all opponents by a combined total of 226 to 39, and was ranked No. 7 in the final AP Poll. Don Faurot was the head coach for the seventh of 19 seasons. The team played its home games at Memorial Stadium in Columbia, Missouri.

The team's leading scorer was junior halfback Bob Steuber with 67 points. Five Missouri players were selected by the United Press as first-team players on the 1941 All-Big Six Conference football team: Steuber; senior quarterback Harry Ice; senior center Darold Jenkins; senior guard Robert Jeffries; and senior tackle Norville Wallach. Three others (quarterback Maurice Wade, end Bert Ekern, and tackle Robert Brenton) were named to the second team.

Schedule

References

Missouri
Missouri Tigers football seasons
Big Eight Conference football champion seasons
Missouri Tigers football